The Rallye Açores, known originally as the Volta à Ilha de São Miguel is an international rally racing event based on the Portuguese island of São Miguel Island in the Azores. The event has been a long running round of the European Rally Championship and the Portuguese Rally Championship as well as spawning its own championship in the Azores. It has also in the recent past been a round of the Intercontinental Rally Challenge and the ERC derivative series, the European Rally Cup West. Unlike other international events held on Atlantic Ocean islands that it is frequently paired with, the Rali Vinho da Madeira and the Rally Islas Canarias it is a gravel event.

The rally was first run in 1965 as locals gathered for a race called Volta à Ilha de São Miguel, which translated means Round the Island of São Miguel. This was six years after the establishment of the Rali Vinho da Madeira on the Portuguese island of Madeira, much closer to Africa.

Despite its isolated location, over 1500 kilometres from the coast of Portugal (the Azores are actually closer to Canada), it has since the early 1970s been a part of Portugal's national championship and has been an international event since 1992 when it was first included in the European Rally Championship. The rally was demoted to the European Rally Cup West in 2004 and dropped entirely in 2006. In 2008 the rally regained international standing with the European Rally Cup South series and the Intercontinental Rally Challenge the following year. After the death of the IRC in 2012 the European Championship returned in 2013.

Portuguese drivers have dominated the event. A non-Portuguese driver did not win the event until the first international event in 1992 was won by Yves Loubert. Portuguese drivers would continue to dominate, though, with Fernando Peres winning the rally seven times in the international era. Carlos Bica has won the event four times.

List of winners
Sourced in part from:

References

External links
Official website
European Rally Championship

 
Açores
Açores